Charles Kitchener Shannon (March 22, 1916 — August 25, 1974) was a professional ice hockey player who played 4 games in the National Hockey League for the New York Americans during the 1939–40 season. The rest of his career, which lasted from 1933 to 1948, was spent in various minor leagues.

Biography
His family moved to Niagara Falls in 1918. Shannon's hockey career spanned 28 years, beginning in 1933 through to the late 1950s.

He began playing Junior Hockey for the Niagara Falls Kiwanis from 1932 to 1933, moving to the Sudbury Wolves until 1935. From the Wolves he went to the Memorial Cup in Winnipeg and that same year, signed a three-year contract with the Toronto Maple Leafs.

His career followed with the Syracuse Stars, Springfield Indians, Pittsburgh Hornets and Buffalo Bisons, all of the American Hockey League. He also played four games for the New York Americans of the National Hockey League.

In 1946 and 1947, Shannon became a playing coach with the Owen Sound Mercuries Senior "A" club and then with the Orangeville Senior "B" Team.

From 1950 to 1952, Shannon coached the first Niagara Falls Cataracts Senior Team to ever play in the O.H.A. Semi-Finals. Shannon also coached the 1955-56 Niagara Falls Senior "A" Team and in the late 1950s, the Stamford Kerrio's Senior "B" Team.

Shannon acquired a number of nicknames, given by his teammates, fans and press. "Specs Shannon", given because he was the first NHL hockey player to successfully wear glasses while playing hockey.

It took almost thirty years before the next Niagara Falls hockey player, Derek Sanderson, made it to the NHL. Shannon coached local minor hockey in Niagara Falls, Ontario following his retirement from playing.

Career statistics

Regular season and playoffs

References

External links

1916 births
1974 deaths
Canadian ice hockey defencemen
Buffalo Bisons (AHL) players
Ice hockey people from Ontario
Kansas City Greyhounds players
New York Americans players
Ontario Hockey Association Senior A League (1890–1979) players
People from Northumberland County, Ontario
Pittsburgh Hornets players
Providence Reds players
Springfield Indians players
Syracuse Stars (AHL) players
Syracuse Stars (IHL) players